Novooleksiivka railway station is a major junction railway station in Novooleksiyivka, Ukraine.

History
The station was opened on October 14, 1874 on the Melitopol–Dzhankoy line.

In 2014, the line to Crimea was closed due to the Russian occupation of Crimea. Consequently, all lines that previously were linked to Crimea now end at this station.

On March 8, 2022, in the first stage of the 2022 Russian invasion of Ukraine, an armored Russian train was recorded by locals using the lines near the station. The train was widely believed to be the "Baikal Train," which had previously participated in Russian military drills in Crimea in 2016.

Trains 
 Kyiv – Novooleksiivka
 Kharkiv – Novooleksiivka
 Lviv – Novooleksiivka
 Ivano-Frankivsk – Henichesk
 Dnipro, Krivoi Rog – Henichesk
 Khmelnytskyi – Henichesk
 Kovel – Novooleksiivka
 Minsk – Novooleksiivka

References

External links

 

Railway stations in Dnipropetrovsk Oblast
Railway stations opened in 1874